Harlan Cleveland (January 19, 1918 – May 30, 2008) was an American diplomat, educator, and author. He served as Lyndon B. Johnson's U.S. Ambassador to NATO from 1965 to 1969, and earlier as U.S. Assistant Secretary of State for International Organization Affairs from 1961 to 1965. He was president of the University of Hawaii from 1969 to 1974, president of the World Academy of Art and Science in the 1990s, and Founding dean of the University of Minnesota's Hubert H. Humphrey Institute of Public Affairs. Cleveland also served as dean of the Maxwell School of Citizenship and Public Affairs at Syracuse University from 1956 to 1961.

He was born in New York City to Stanley Matthews Cleveland and Marian Van Buren. His siblings were Harold van Buren Cleveland, an economist, Anne Cleveland White, an artist, and Stanley Cleveland, a diplomat. He attended Phillips Andover Academy and graduated from Princeton University in 1938. He was a Rhodes Scholar at Oxford University in the late 1930s. He was  an early advocate and practitioner of online education, teaching courses for the Western Behavioral Sciences Institute (WBSI) and Connected Education in the 1980s and early 1990s.

During the 1980s Cleveland was elected as a Fellow of the World Academy of Art & Science (WAAS) and a member of the Club of Rome and served actively in both organization for more than a quarter century. He served as president of the World Academy of Art Science (1990–1998) and remained a member of the board of trustees until his death in 2008. After participating in the final meeting of the International Commission on Peace & Food (ICPF) at the Carter Presidential Center in October 1993, Cleveland released ICPF’s report to the UN entitled Uncommon Opportunities: Agenda for Peace & Equitable Development at the Minneapolis General Assembly in October 1994 and then served as chairman of the commission’s successor organization International Center for Peace and Development in California through the rest of his lifetime. He also represented both WAAS and ICPD at the 10th anniversary conference of ICPF in Delhi in October 2004. During this period, the academy took up a number of the research programs initiated by ICPF, including its work on nuclear abolition, cooperative security, employment and theory of social development.

He authored twelve books, among his best-known are The Knowledge Executive (1985) and Nobody in Charge: Essays on the Future of Leadership (2002). He also published hundreds of journal and magazine articles. His final published writing was the opening chapter for "Creating a Learning Culture: Strategy, Technology, and Practice" (2004) entitled, "Leading and learning with nobody in charge."

He was awarded 22 honorary degrees, the U.S. Presidential Medal of Freedom, Princeton University's Woodrow Wilson Award, the Peace Corps' Leader for Peace Award, and the American Whig-Cliosophic Society's James Madison Award for Distinguished Public Service.  He was the co-winner (with Bertrand de Jouvenel) of the 1981 Prix de Talloires, an international award for "accomplished generalists". He was a trustee of the Chaordic Commons.

See also
 DIKW
 International Leadership Forum

References

 Obituary in The Washington Post
 Obituary in The Star Tribune
 University of Hawaii press release
In Memory of Harlan Cleveland by Patrick Mendis in The Minnesota Post

External links
 Club of Rome
 Cleveland on Leadership, an article from THE FUTURIST magazine 
 International Leadership Forum

1918 births
2008 deaths
Writers from New York City
Futurologists
Princeton University alumni
American Rhodes Scholars
Permanent Representatives of the United States to NATO
Presidents of the University of Hawaii System
Leaders of the University of Hawaiʻi at Mānoa
Presidential Medal of Freedom recipients
20th-century American male writers
Syracuse University faculty
20th-century American academics